RK Speed is a Danish rugby union club in Kastrup, Copenhagen on the island of Amager. It is the oldest rugby club in Denmark.

History
In 1947-48, after the Second World War, a group of young Danes who had served in the British Army learnt the rules of rugby union.

They met again in Copenhagen after their return and decided to start a rugby union club that would take the name of “Ex-Army”. Their rivals were mainly visiting teams from Great Britain and then the Police Rugby Club, formed in 1948-49 by Eigil Hemmert Lund, who also founded the DRU (Danish Rugby Union).

During the first weeks of 1949, the veteran soldiers did not meet as often as the previous years, however rugby garnered support from other locals who were interested in continuing playing, so all interested in continuing rugby in Denmark were invited to a meeting on 31 March 1949.

A good mix of people were present that day, new players who wanted to become club members as well as a few of those former soldiers who wanted to keep on playing rugby.

They decided they had to change the club's name and narrowed it down two options. Since they could not decide, they drew from a hat. That is how RK Speed took its name and was later founded.

The club was established in 1949 and has played senior-level rugby in Denmark since its formation, becoming the oldest Danish club, a day older than the Danish Rugby Union, formed by Eigil Hemmert Lund on 1 April 1949, although it was only officially established in 1950.

RK Speed has been one of the most successful clubs in Danish Rugby ever since.

11 Danish Championships 
3 Cup Trophies 
1 Nordic Championship

are amongst others, the club's honours.

Recent Internationally Capped Players
  Oliver Le Roux 
  Johannes Mackeprang (captain 2015-2018)
  Nicklas V Tell (captain 2018)
  Malte Madsen
  Christian Fiji Melgaard
  Mark Franklin Nielsen
  Emil Enna
  Kristoffer Vandborg
  Dodji Hounou
  Gerard Hounou
  Victor Hounou
  Junaire Brown
  Jeppe Holm
  Simon Holm
  Matias Dinesen
  Joakim Nielsen
  Ruben Garcia
  Esben Thorius
  Anders Hagelin
  Bradley Diamandis
  Alexander Østergaard
  Nicolai Stark
  Dennis Stark
  Pierre Weiss
  Bulela “Butch” Butsheke
  Oliver Hvass

References

External links
RK Speed

Rugby clubs established in 1949
Danish rugby union teams
Sports teams in Copenhagen